Gushkhani (also Romanized as Gūshkhānī; also known as Goshkhāneh and Qoshkhāneh) is a village in Razab Rural District, in the Central District of Sarvabad County, Kurdistan Province, Iran. At the 2006 census, its population was 1,107, in 289 families. The village is populated by Kurds.

References 

Towns and villages in Sarvabad County
Kurdish settlements in Kurdistan Province